Nazim Asadulla oghlu Rzayev (February 19, 1925 — May 2, 2006) was an Azerbaijani conductor, head of the chamber orchestra of the Azerbaijani television and radio, People's Artist of the Azerbaijan SSR, laureate of the USSR and Azerbaijan State Prizes, professor.

Biography 
Nazim Rzayev was born on February 14, 1925, in Baku. In 1951, he graduated from the Moscow State Tchaikovsky Conservatory on violin. After returning to Baku, he worked as an orchestra concertmaster at the Azerbaijan State Academic Opera and Ballet Theater and as a chamber class teacher at the Azerbaijan State Conservatory. In 1958 he switched from performing to conducting. A year later, he took an active part in the preparation of the Decade of Azerbaijani Literature and Art in Moscow.

Nazim Rzayev was an intern at the Bolshoi Theatre in Moscow in 1961-1963 under the direction of People's Artist of the USSR Alexander Melik-Pashayev. After returning to Baku, he headed the opera studio of the Azerbaijan State Conservatory. Under his leadership, Domenico Cimarosa's "Secret Marriage", Uzeyir Hajibeyov's "Koroghlu" and Fikret Amirov's "Sevil" operas were performed in the studio. Nazim Rzayev also took part in the activities of the Hajibeyov Azerbaijan State Symphony Orchestra. He conducted works by Beethoven, Tchaikovsky, Brahms, Strauss, Gara Garayev, Fikret Amirov and other composers.

Nazim Rzayev began to work as the artistic director and chief conductor of the chamber orchestra of the Azerbaijan Television and Radio in 1964. The orchestra led by him performed Uzeyir Hajibeyov's novel "Without You", Aisha's dance in Gara Garayev's ballet "Seven Beauties" and girls' dance from the ballet "The Path of Thunder". Later, Gara Garayev's Third Symphony and Classical Suite, Fikret Amirov's "Nizami" Symphony, "Gulustan-Bayati-Shiraz" mugham and "Arabian Nights" ballet took an important place in the conductor's repertoire.

Nazim Rzayev toured with a chamber orchestra in a number of cities of the USSR and abroad. During the 1984–1985 theater season, he was the founding conductor of Uzeyir Hajibeyov's musical comedy "Arshin Mal Alan" at the Ankara State Opera and Ballet Theater. In the following years he worked in Turkey.

He was also engaged in pedagogical activities, and since 1952 had taught at the Azerbaijan State Conservatory. He became an associate professor in 1968 and a professor in 1985.

Nazim Rzayev died on May 2, 2006, in Eskişehir.

Awards 
 People's Artist of the Azerbaijan SSR — June 29, 1977
 Honored Artist of the Azerbaijan SSR — April 29, 1958
 USSR State Prize — November 6, 1980
 Azerbaijan SSR State Prize — April 26, 1974
 Order of the Badge of Honour — June 9, 1959
 Honorary Decree of the Presidium of the Supreme Soviet of the Azerbaijan SSR — December 9, 1966; July 7, 1967; February 24, 1979; June 14 1985

References 

Moscow Conservatory alumni
Azerbaijani conductors (music)
Recipients of the USSR State Prize
1925 births
2006 deaths